Angelo Arrigoni (16 February 1923 – 27 September 2014) was an Italian rugby union and professional rugby league footballer who played in the 1940s and 1950s.

Playing career

International honours

Rugby union
Arrigoni represented Italy (RU) in the 6-14 defeat by Czechoslovakia at Strahov Stadium, Prague on Sunday 22 May 1949.

Rugby league
Vincenzo Bertolotto co-organised (with Dennis Chappell , from Wakefield, and a Turin resident), and captained the Italy (RL) tour of 1950 to France (3 matches), England (including; 28-49 defeat by Wigan at Central Park, Wigan on Saturday 26 August 1950, Huddersfield at Fartown Ground, Huddersfield on Wednesday 6 September 1950, St. Helens at Knowsley Road on Thursday 16 November 1950), and Wales (including; 11-29 defeat by South Wales XIII at Brewery Field, Bridgend on Saturday 2 September 1950).

The Italy (RL) squad was; Guido Aleati (previously of R.S. Ginnastica Torino (RU)), Sergio Aleati (previously of R.S. Ginnastica Torino (RU)), Roberto Antonioli (previously of R.S. Ginnastica Torino (RU)), Angelo Arrigoni (previously of R.S. Ginnastica Torino (RU)), Vincenzo Bertolotto (previously of R.S. Ginnastica Torino (RU)), Michele Bietto, Giovanni Bonino (previously of R.S. Ginnastica Torino (RU)), Luigi Bosia, Giuseppe Cannone, Pasquale Cannone, Delio Caron, Gabriele Casalegno (previously of R.S. Ginnastica Torino (RU)), Amerio Chiara, Giorgio Cornacchia, Guido Cornarino (previously of R.S. Ginnastica Torino (RU)), Fabrizio Faglioli, Enzo Francesconi, Giuseppe Franco, Aldo Guglielminotti (previously of R.S. Ginnastica Torino (RU)), Giovanni Orecchia, Luigi Pignattaro, Franco Pipino, Giorgio Rassaval, Giorgio Rubino, Giovanni Tamagno (previously of R.S. Ginnastica Torino (RU)), Oreste Tescari and Giovanni Vigna.

Club career

Rugby union
Arrigoni was a member of the R.S. Ginnastica Torino (RU) team that won the 1947 Campionati italiani. In honour of this, Arrigoni's name appears alongside his teammates on a plaque affixed to Motovelodromo Fausto Coppi in Turin, the squad was; eight players that would subsequently accompany Arrigoni on the 1950 rugby league tour, and also Ausonio Alacevich, Bianco, Campi, Chiosso, Chiosso, Mario Dotti IV, Pescarmona, Piovano, Rocca, Felice Rama (coach), Siliquini, and Sandro Vigliano.

Rugby league
Following the Italy (RL) tour of 1950 to France, England, and Wales, a Torino XIII featuring Angelo Arrigoni joined the French league.

References

Benedetto Pasqua; Mirio Da Roit, Cent'anni di rugby a Torino (One Hundred Years of Rugby in Turin), Torino, Ananke [2011]
Francesco Volpe; Paolo Pacetti, Rugby 2012, Roma, Zesi [2011]
Gianluca Barca; Gian Franco Bellè, La Sesta Nazione (The Sixth Nation), Parma, Grafiche Step [2008]

External links

Search for "Arrigoni" at rugbyleagueproject.org

Italian rugby league players
Italian rugby union players
Italy international rugby union players
Italy national rugby league team players
Rugby league centres
Rugby league wingers
Rugby union wings
1923 births
2014 deaths